Emerald O’Hanrahan (born 1986) is an English actress known for playing Emma Grundy in The Archers on BBC Radio 4.

Early life 
She was born and grew up in Cambridgeshire. Educated at St Mary's School, Cambridge until 2002, where she took part in school and amateur productions, playing Susan in The Lion, The Witch and The Wardrobe, Juliet in a tour of Romeo and Juliet around East Anglia, and at the Cambridge Arts Theatre as Miranda in The Tempest. She studied for A Levels at the Long Road Sixth Form College, then took a BA in Acting at Bristol Old Vic Theatre School, where she won the Carleton Hobbs Bursary.

Career
After graduation in July 2009, she joined the BBC's Radio Drama Company for five months, taking part in more than 40 productions for BBC Radio 3, BBC Radio 4 and BBC Radio 4 Extra, bringing her to the attention of the producers of The Archers who were looking to recast the role of Emma Grundy following Felicity Jones's decision to depart.

O’Hanrahan has taken to the stage in productions such as Birmingham Repertory Company 2011 double-production of Oscar Wilde’s The Importance of Being Earnest and Tom Stoppard’s Travesties.

In 2014, she voiced Nina Taylor in Creative Assembly's survival horror game Alien: Isolation.

In 2015, she starred in Martin Delaney's short film Queen's Mile.

In 2017, she appeared in the BBC Television series Father Brown as Victoria Nicholson in episode 5.10 "The Alchemist's Secret".

Radio

References

External links
Emma Grundy @ The Archers

1987 births
Living people
People from Cambridgeshire
English Roman Catholics
Alumni of Bristol Old Vic Theatre School
English radio actresses
Place of birth missing (living people)
English stage actresses
English television actresses
The Archers